Hieromantis phaedora is a moth of the Stathmopodidae family. It is found in China (Fujian, Hainan) and the Andaman Islands.

The wingspan is 14−15 mm. The forewings are light yellow-ochreous with raised greyish tufts tipped with black on the dorsum at one-fourth of the wing and above the fold before the middle, these connected by a greyish shade, a patch of a faint greyish tinge in the disc and towards the dorsum preceding these. There is a light prismatic-grey streak surrounded with ferruginous suffusion from the costa beyond the middle directed to the fold, and a similar oblique streak from the disc beyond this to the costa at four-fifths, with a fine white costal streak between these. The apex is ferruginous. The hindwings are grey irrorated with dark grey.

References

Moths described in 1929
Hieromantis